Tung Soo Hua is a Singaporean news anchor and presenter contracted under Mediacorp.

Career
Tung is a television news anchor and current affairs presenter with MediaCorp TV Channel 8 and Channel U. Tung joined Mediacorp in 1997 as a Chinese-language news editor before becoming a news reporter and anchor in 2000.

Having fronted Mediacorp Channel 8 news programmes such as Singapore Today, Singapore Today Roving News, News 8 at Ten, Money Week and World This Week, Tung has interviewed over 70 chief executive officers and head honchos of listed companies, reaffirming her accomplishment as the show host of Singapore's leading Chinese-language financial television programme.

In her 15-year career as journalist, Tung has covered major events including APEC, ASEAN summits, World Bank/IMF meetings and Singapore's General Elections between 2001 and 2015.  Most recently, she hosted "Singapore General Election 2015", a seven-hour mega "live" show telecast on Channel 8.

Tung extended her role of a business news presenter by hosting the annual Budget Forums between 2002 and 2015. The program is a much-watched event which follows right after the Finance Minister's Budget Statement in Parliament.

She also served the role of Mandarin commentator for the 'live' coverage of National Day Parade 10 times between 2002 and 2015. The program is an annual 3-hour mega show on Singapore's National Day.

Tung won the Best Chinese-language News Presenter award for Star Awards in 2004, 2005, 2006, 2007, 2009, 2011, 2012 and 2013 Star Awards.

Education
Tung attended Nanyang Girls' High School and National Junior College before graduating from the National University of Singapore with a Bachelor of Science with first honours degree in mathematics. She subsequently went on to complete a Master of Social Sciences degree in international studies.

Awards and achievements

References

Living people
Singaporean broadcast news analysts
National University of Singapore alumni
National Junior College alumni
Singaporean people of Hokkien descent
Malaysian emigrants to Singapore
Singaporean television personalities
Singaporean television journalists
Singaporean journalists
Mediacorp
Year of birth missing (living people)
Singaporean women journalists